The 2012–13 Memphis Grizzlies season was the 18th season of the franchise in the National Basketball Association (NBA), and the 12th for the franchise in Memphis.

The season saw the Grizzlies make the Conference Finals for the first time in franchise history. Prior to making the Conference Finals, the Grizzlies defeated the Los Angeles Clippers in six games in the First Round, and defeated the top-seeded defending runner-up Oklahoma City Thunder in five games in the Semifinals. However, a four-game sweep to the experienced San Antonio Spurs ended the Grizzlies' season and playoff run. Head coach Lionel Hollins was fired at the conclusion of the season.

Led by Marc Gasol, the Defensive Player of the Year, the 2013 Grizzlies held opponents to 89.3 points per game. This is the last time a team allowed under 90 points per game in an NBA season.

As of 2022, this is the closest the Grizzlies were to the finals.

Key dates
June 28: The 2012 NBA draft took place at Prudential Center in Newark, New Jersey.

Draft picks

Roster

Regular season

Standings

Game log

|- style="background:#fcc;"
| 1 || October 31 || @ L. A. Clippers
| 
| Rudy Gay (25)
| Zach Randolph (16)
| Conley & Gasol (5)
| Staples Center19,060
| 0–1

|- style="background:#cfc;"	
| 2 || November 2 || @ Golden State
| 
| Conley & Gasol (21)
| Zach Randolph (14)
| Mike Conley, Jr. (7)
| Oracle Arena19,596
| 1–1
|- style="background:#cfc;"								
| 3 || November 5 || Utah
| 
| Marc Gasol (22)
| Zach Randolph (18)
| Marc Gasol (8)
| FedExForum17,401
| 2-1
|- style="background:#cfc;"								
| 4 || November 7 || @ Milwaukee
| 
| Randolph & Speights (18)
| Zach Randolph (13)
| Mike Conley, Jr. (12)
| BMO Harris Bradley Center11,465
| 3-1
|- style="background:#cfc;"								
| 5 || November 9 || Houston
| 
| Rudy Gay (21)
| Zach Randolph (14)
| Mike Conley, Jr. (4)
| FedExForum16,087
| 4-1
|- style="background:#cfc;"								
| 6 || November 11 || Miami
| 
| Wayne Ellington (25)
| Zach Randolph (12)
| Mike Conley, Jr. (9)
| FedExForum18,119
| 5-1
|- style="background:#cfc;"								
| 7 || November 14 || @ Oklahoma City
| 
| Rudy Gay (28)
| Zach Randolph (11)
| Mike Conley, Jr. (7)
| Chesapeake Energy Arena18,203
| 6-1
|- style="background:#cfc;"								
| 8 || November 16 || New York
| 
| Marc Gasol (24)
| Zach Randolph (15)
| Mike Conley, Jr. (8)
| FedExForum17,516
| 7-1
|- style="background:#cfc;"								
| 9 || November 17 || @ Charlotte
| 
| Mike Conley, Jr. (20)
| Zach Randolph (12)
| Marc Gasol (7)
| Time Warner Cable Arena16,541
| 8-1
|- style="background:#fcc;"								
| 10 || November 19 || Denver
| 
| Rudy Gay (22)
| Zach Randolph (13)
| Mike Conley, Jr. (8)
| FedExForum15,111
| 8-2
|- style="background:#cfc;"								
| 11 || November 23 || L. A. Lakers
| 
| Rudy Gay (21)
| Zach Randolph (12)
| Marc Gasol (8)
| FedExForum18,119
| 9-2
|- style="background:#cfc;"								
| 12 || November 26 || Cleveland
| 
| Gasol & Randolph (19)
| Zach Randolph (8)
| Jerryd Bayless (6)
| FedExForum13,485
| 10-2
|- style="background:#cfc;"								
| 13 || November 28 || Toronto
| 
| Marreese Speights (18)
| Zach Randolph (13)
| Zach Randolph (6)
| FedExForum14,603
| 11-2
|- style="background:#cfc;"								
| 14 || November 30 || Detroit
| 
| Rudy Gay (18)
| Marc Gasol (11)
| Mike Conley, Jr. (5)
| FedExForum16,732
| 12-2

|- style="background:#fcc;"								
| 15 || December 1 || @ San Antonio
| 
| Marc Gasol (20)
| Zach Randolph (15)
| Mike Conley, Jr. (12)
| AT&T Center18,581
| 12-3
|- style="background:#cfc;"								
| 16 || December 4 || Phoenix
| 
| Zach Randolph (38)
| Zach Randolph (22)
| Marc Gasol (4)
| FedExForum14,481
| 13-3
|- style="background:#cfc;"								
| 17 || December 7 || @ New Orleans
| 
| Rudy Gay (28)
| Marc Gasol (9)
| Mike Conley, Jr. (9)
| New Orleans Arena13,698
| 14-3
|- style="background:#fcc;"								
| 18 || December 8 || Atlanta
| 
| Gasol & Randolph (18)
| Zach Randolph (13)
| Marc Gasol (5)
| FedExForum17,612
| 14-4
|- style="background:#fcc;"
| 19 || December 12 || @ Phoenix
| 
| Rudy Gay (21)
| Rudy Gay (11)
| Mike Conley, Jr. (6)
| US Airways Center13,093
| 14-5
|- style="background:#fcc;"								
| 20 || December 14 || @ Denver
| 
| Rudy Gay (21)
| Marc Gasol (9)
| Jerryd Bayless (11)
| Pepsi Center16,367
| 14-6
|- style="background:#cfc;"								
| 21 || December 15 || @ Utah
| 
| Zach Randolph (25)
| Zach Randolph (16)
| Mike Conley, Jr. (8)
| EnergySolutions Arena18,183
| 15-6
|- style="background:#cfc;"								
| 22 || December 17 || Chicago
| 
| Mike Conley, Jr. (17)
| Zach Randolph (15)
| Mike Conley, Jr. (4)
| FedExForum17,305
| 16-6
|- style="background:#cfc;"								
| 23 || December 19 || Milwaukee
| 
| Zach Randolph (15)
| Zach Randolph (17)
| Mike Conley, Jr. (6)
| FedExForum16,007
| 17-6
|- style="background:#cfc;"								
| 24 || December 21 || Dallas
| 
| Rudy Gay (26)
| Zach Randolph (13)
| Mike Conley, Jr. (11)
| FedExForum17,677
| 18-6
|- style="background:#fcc;"								
| 25 || December 22 || @ Houston
| 
| Mike Conley, Jr. (16)
| Zach Randolph (10)
| Mike Conley, Jr. (6)
| Toyota Center18,029
| 18-7
|- style="background:#fcc;"								
| 26 || December 26 || Philadelphia
| 
| Zach Randolph (23)
| Zach Randolph (9)
| Marc Gasol (8)
| FedExForum16,055
| 18-8
|- style="background:#cfc;"								
| 27 || December 29 || Denver
| 
| Rudy Gay (19)
| Marreese Speights (10)
| Mike Conley, Jr. (6)
| FedExForum17,707
| 19-8
|- style="background:#fcc;"								
| 28 || December 31 || @ Indiana
| 
| Zach Randolph (21)
| Zach Randolph (15)
| Mike Conley, Jr. (7)
| Bankers Life Fieldhouse14,979
| 19-9

|- style="background:#cfc;"								
| 29 || January 2 || @ Boston
| 
| Mike Conley, Jr. (23)
| Zach Randolph (8)
| Mike Conley, Jr. (9)
| TD Garden18,624
| 20-9
|- style="background:#fcc;"								
| 30 || January 4 || Portland
| 
| Marreese Speights (22)
| Marreese Speights (13)
| Conley & Gasol (3)
| FedExForum15,823
| 20-10
|- style="background:#cfc;"								
| 31 || January 6 || @ Phoenix
| 
| Zach Randolph (21)
| Marc Gasol (12)
| Mike Conley, Jr. (9)
| US Airways Center13,197
| 21-10
|- style="background:#cfc;"								
| 32 || January 7 || @ Sacramento
| 
| Wayne Ellington (26)
| Zach Randolph (7)
| Mike Conley, Jr. (8)
| Sleep Train Arena11,531
| 22-10
|- style="background:#cfc;"								
| 33 || January 9 || @ Golden State
| 
| Zach Randolph (19)
| Zach Randolph (12)
| Bayless & Gay (6)
| Oracle Arena19,596
| 23-10
|- style="background:#cfc;"								
| 34 || January 11 || San Antonio
| 
| Rudy Gay (23)
| Zach Randolph (10)
| Mike Conley, Jr. (5)
| FedExForum17,685
| 24-10
|- style="background:#fcc;"								
| 35 || January 12 || @ Dallas
| 
| Rudy Gay (12)
| Darrell Arthur (9)
| Jerryd Bayless (5)
| American Airlines Center19,984
| 24-11
|- style="background:#fcc;"								
| 36 || January 14 || L. A. Clippers
| 
| Zach Randolph (15)
| Zach Randolph (12)
| Tony Allen (4)
| FedExForum15,837
| 24-12
|- style="background:#fcc;"								
| 37 || January 16 || @ San Antonio
| 
| Rudy Gay (17)
| Rudy Gay (8)
| Mike Conley, Jr. (3)
| AT&T Center18,581
| 24-13
|- style="background:#cfc;"								
| 38 || January 18 || Sacramento
| 
| Mike Conley, Jr. (19)
| Marc Gasol (10)
| Tony Allen (6)
| FedExForum15,910
| 25-13
|- style="background:#cfc;"
| 39 || January 19 || @ Chicago
| 
| Marc Gasol (19)
| Zach Randolph (19)
| Mike Conley, Jr. (9)
| United Center22,124
| 26-13
|- style="background:#fcc;"
| 40 || January 21 || Indiana
| 
| Wayne Ellington (17)
| Rudy Gay (8)
| Jerryd Bayless (5)
| FedExForum17,508
| 26-14
|- style="background:#cfc;"								
| 41 || January 23 || L. A. Lakers
| 
| Darrell Arthur (20)
| Rudy Gay (11)
| Mike Conley, Jr. (6)
| FedExForum17,984
| 27-14
|- style="background:#cfc;"
| 42 || January 25 || Brooklyn
| 
| Marc Gasol (20)
| Gasol & Randolph (9)
| Jerryd Bayless (8)
| FedExForum16,911
| 28-14
|- style="background:#fcc;"
| 43 || January 27 || New Orleans
| 
| Zach Randolph (20)
| Zach Randolph (13)
| Jerryd Bayless (5)
| FedExForum16,277
| 28-15
|- style="background:#cfc;"
| 44 || January 28 || @ Philadelphia
| 
| Marc Gasol (27)
| Zach Randolph (12)
| Jerryd Bayless (9)
| Wells Fargo Center15,448
| 29-15
|- style="background:#fcc;"
| 45 || January 31 || @ Oklahoma City
| 
| Jerryd Bayless (23)
| Zach Randolph (19)
| Jerryd Bayless (6)
| Chesapeake Energy Arena18,203
| 29-16

|- style="background:#cfc;"
| 46 || February 1 || Washington
| 
| Mike Conley, Jr. (18)
| Marc Gasol (15)
| Mike Conley, Jr. (6)
| FedExForum15,017
| 30-16
|- style="background:#fcc;"
| 47 || February 5 || Phoenix
| 
| Jerryd Bayless (29)
| Zach Randolph (13)
| Mike Conley, Jr. (5)
| FedExForum14,933
| 30-17
|- style="background:#fcc;"
| 48 || February 6 || @ Atlanta
| 
| Zach Randolph (20)
| Marc Gasol (10)
| Mike Conley, Jr. (8)
| Philips Arena13,198
| 30-18
|- style="background:#cfc;"
| 49 || February 8 || Golden State
| 
| Marc Gasol (20)
| Zach Randolph (12)
| Mike Conley, Jr. (10)
| FedExForum16,701
| 31-18
|- style="background:#cfc;"
| 50 || February 10 || Minnesota
| 
| Tayshaun Prince (18)
| Marc Gasol (9)
| Conley & Gasol (8)
| FedExForum16,023
| 32-18
|- style="background:#cfc;"
| 51 || February 12 || Sacramento
| 
| Marc Gasol (24)
| Marc Gasol (12)
| Mike Conley, Jr. (7)
| FedExForum14,722
| 33-18
|- align="center"
|colspan="9" bgcolor="#bbcaff"|All-Star Break
|- style="background:#cfc;"								
| 52 || February 19 || @ Detroit
| 
| Mike Conley, Jr. (19)
| Zach Randolph (10)
| Jerryd Bayless (10)
| The Palace of Auburn Hills13,481
| 34-18
|- style="background:#cfc;"								
| 53 || February 20 || @ Toronto
| 
| Randolph & Conley (17)
| Zach Randolph (18)
| Mike Conley, Jr. (6)
| Air Canada Centre19,800
| 35-18
|- style="background:#cfc;"								
| 54 || February 22 || Orlando
|  
| Marc Gasol (19)
| Zach Randolph (14)
| Mike Conley, Jr. (7)
| FedExForum17,669 
| 36-18
|- style="background:#cfc;"								
| 55 || February 24 || @ Brooklyn
|  
| Zach Randolph (16)
| Zach Randolph (14)
| Mike Conley, Jr. (7)
| Barclays Center17,098 
| 37-18
|- style="background:#cfc;"								
| 56 || February 27 || Dallas
|  
| Zach Randolph (22)
| Marc Gasol (12)
| Mike Conley, Jr. (6)
| FedExForum16,017 
| 38-18

|- style="background:#fcc;"								
| 57 || March 1 || @ Miami
|  
| Marc Gasol (24)
| Zach Randolph (9)
| Mike Conley, Jr. (8)
| American Airlines Arena20,128 
| 38-19
|- style="background:#cfc;"								
| 58 || March 3 || @ Orlando
|  
| Tayshaun Prince (14)
| Ed Davis (10)
| Marc Gasol (11)
| Amway Center16,020 
| 39-19
|- style="background:#cfc;"								
| 59 || March 6 || Portland
| 
| Marc Gasol (23)
| Marc Gasol (12)
| Mike Conley, Jr. (6)
| FedExForum16,214 
| 40-19
|- style="background:#cfc;"								
| 60 || March 8 || @ Cleveland
| 
| Marc Gasol (22)
| Ed Davis (9)
| Mike Conley, Jr. (11)
| Quicken Loans Arena17,032 
| 41-19
|- style="background:#cfc;"								
| 61 || March 9 || New Orleans
|  
| Mike Conley, Jr. (22)
| Ed Davis (9)
| Mike Conley, Jr. (8)
| FedExForum17,501 
| 42-19
|- style="background:#cfc;"								
| 62 || March 12 || @ Portland
| 
| Marc Gasol (20)
| Zach Randolph (10)
| Mike Conley, Jr. (15)
| Rose Garden18,754
| 43-19
|- style="background:#cfc;"								
| 63 || March 13 || @ L. A. Clippers
| 
| Marc Gasol (21)  
| Zach Randolph (8)
| Mike Conley, Jr. (11)
| Staples Center19,316
| 44-19
|- style="background:#fcc;"								
| 64 || March 15 || @ Denver
| 
| Zach Randolph (18)
| Zach Randolph (18)
| Marc Gasol (5)
| Pepsi Center19,408 
| 44-20
|- style="background:#fcc;"								
| 65 || March 16 || @ Utah
| 
| Jerryd Bayless (24)
| Zach Randolph (9)
| Mike Conley, Jr. (4)
| EnergySolutions Arena17,122 
| 44–21
|- style="background:#cfc;"								
| 66 || March 18 || Minnesota
| 
| Mike Conley, Jr. (20)
| Tayshaun Prince (14)
| Mike Conley, Jr. (6)
| FedExForum16,378 
| 45–21
|- style="background:#cfc;"								
| 67 || March 20 || Oklahoma City
| 
| Mike Conley, Jr. (24)
| Zach Randolph (18)
| Mike Conley, Jr. (5)
| FedExForum18,119 
| 46–21
|- style="background:#fcc;"								
| 68 || March 22 || @ New Orleans
| 
| Mike Conley, Jr. (20)
| Zach Randolph (9)
| Marc Gasol (4)
| New Orleans Arena16,494 
| 46–22
|- style="background:#cfc;"								
| 69 || March 23 || Boston
|  
| Jerryd Bayless (30)
| Zach Randolph (11)
| Mike Conley, Jr. (10)
| FedExForum18,119 
| 47–22
|- style="background:#fcc;"								
| 70 || March 25 || @ Washington
| 
| Mike Conley, Jr. (23)
| Zach Randolph (7)
| Mike Conley, Jr. (7)
| Verizon Center17,868 
| 47–23
|- style="background:#fcc;"								
| 71 || March 27 || @ New York
| 
| Mike Conley, Jr. (26)
| Tony Allen (10)
| Mike Conley, Jr. (6)
| Madison Square Garden19,033 
| 47–24
|- style="background:#cfc;"								
| 72 || March 29 || Houston
| 
| Zach Randolph (21)
| Zach Randolph (12)
| Mike Conley, Jr. (10)
| FedExForum18,119 
| 48-24
|- style="background:#cfc;"								
| 73 || March 30 || @ Minnesota
|  
| Marc Gasol (21)
| Marc Gasol (8)
| Jerryd Bayless (7)
| Target Center13,680 
| 49–24

|- style="background:#cfc;"								
|  74 || April 1 || San Antonio
|  
| Mike Conley, Jr. (23)
| Zach Randolph (10)
| Prince & Gasol (4)
| FedExForum16,642 
| 50–24
|- style="background:#cfc;"								
| 75 || April 3 || @ Portland
|  
| Mike Conley, Jr. (20)
| Ed Davis (10)
| Jerryd Bayless (7)
| Rose Garden19,275 
| 51–24
|- style="background:#fcc;"								
| 76 || April 5 || @ L. A. Lakers
| 
| Mike Conley, Jr. (21)
| Marc Gasol (8)
| Marc Gasol (7)
| Staples Center18,997
| 51–25
|- style="background:#cfc;"								
| 77 || April 7 || @ Sacramento
| 
| Mike Conley, Jr. (25)
| Marc Gasol (10)
| Conley & Gasol (4)
| Power Balance Pavilion15,205
| 52–25
|- style="background:#cfc;"								
| 78 || April 9 || Charlotte
| 
| Mike Conley, Jr. (20)
| Zach Randolph (13)
|  Mike Conley, Jr. (7)
| FedExForum16,591
| 53–25
|- style="background:#cfc;"								
| 79 || April 12 || @ Houston
| 
| Randolph & Gasol (15)
| Marc Gasol (12)
| Conley & Gasol (5)
| Toyota Center18,163
| 54–25
|- style="background:#fcc;"								
| 80 || April 13 || L. A. Clippers
| 
| Marc Gasol (18)
| Marc Gasol (15)
| Marc Gasol (7)
| FedExForum18,119
| 54-26
|- style="background:#cfc;"								
| 81 || April 15 || @ Dallas
| 
| Jerryd Bayless (19)
| Ed Davis (11)
| Marc Gasol (6)
| American Airlines Center19,833
| 55–26
|- style="background:#cfc;"								
| 82 || April 17 || Utah
| 
| Zach Randolph (25)
| Zach Randolph (19)
| Mike Conley, Jr. (5)
| FedExForum16,777
| 56–26

Playoffs

Game log

|- bgcolor=ffcccc
| 1
| April 20
| @ L.A. Clippers
| 
| Jerryd Bayless (19)
| Ed Davis (6)
| Marc Gasol (7)
| Staples Center19,373
| 0—1
|- bgcolor=ffcccc
| 2
| April 22
| @ L.A. Clippers
| 
| Mike Conley (28)
| Tony Allen (10)
| Mike Conley (9)
| Staples Center19,373
| 0—2
|- bgcolor=ccffcc
| 3
| April 25
| L.A. Clippers
| 
| Zach Randolph (27)
| Zach Randolph (11)
| Mike Conley (10)
| FedExForum18,119
| 1–2
|- bgcolor=ccffcc
| 4
| April 27
| L.A. Clippers
| 
| Gasol,  Randolph (24)
| Marc Gasol (13)
| Mike Conley (13)
| FedExForum18,119
| 2–2
|- bgcolor=ccffcc
| 5
| April 30
| @ L.A. Clippers
| 
| Zach Randolph (25)
| Zach Randolph (11)
| Mike Conley (6)
| Staples Center19,384
| 3–2
|- bgcolor=ccffcc
| 6
| May 3
| L.A. Clippers
| 
| Conley,  Randolph (23)
| Allen. Gasol (7)
| Mike Conley (7)
| FedExForum18,119
| 4–2

|- bgcolor=ffcccc
| 1
| May 5
| @ Oklahoma City
| 
| Marc Gasol  (20)
| Zach Randolph (10)
| Three Players (3)
| Chesapeake Energy Arena18,203
| 0–1
|- bgcolor=ccffcc
| 2
| May 7
| @ Oklahoma City
| 
| Mike Conley (26)
| Mike Conley (10)
| Mike Conley (9)
| Chesapeake Energy Arena18,203
| 1–1
|- bgcolor=ccffcc
| 3
| May 11
| Oklahoma City
| 
| Marc Gasol (20)
| Zach Randolph (10)
| Mike Conley (6)
| FedExForum18,119
| 2–1
|- bgcolor=ccffcc
| 4
| May 13
| Oklahoma City
| 
| Mike Conley (24)
| Zach Randolph (12)
| Conley, Prince (5)
| FedExForum18,119
| 3–1
|- bgcolor=ccffcc
| 5
| May 15
| @ Oklahoma City
| 
| Zach Randolph (28)
| Zach Randolph (14)
| Mike Conley (11)
| Chesapeake Energy Arena18,203
| 4–1

|- bgcolor=ffcccc
| 1
| May 19
| @ San Antonio
| 
| Quincy Pondexter (17)
| Gasol,  Randolph (7)
| Mike Conley (8)
| AT&T Center18,581
| 0–1
|- bgcolor=ffcccc
| 2
| May 21
| @ San Antonio
| 
| Bayless, Conley (18)
| Zach Randolph (18)
| Conley, Gasol (4)
| AT&T Center18,581
| 0–2
|- bgcolor=ffcccc
| 3
| May 25
| San Antonio
| 
| Mike Conley (20)
| Zach Randolph (15)
| Marc Gasol (5)
| FedExForum18,119
| 0–3
|- bgcolor=ffcccc
| 4
| May 27
| San Antonio
| 
| Quincy Pondexter (22)
| Allen, Randolph (8)
| Mike Conley (7)
| FedExForum18,119
| 0–4
|-

See also

References

Memphis Grizzlies seasons
Memphis Grizzlies
Memphis Grizzlies
Memphis Grizzlies
Events in Memphis, Tennessee